Sindarli is a village in the Pali district of Rajasthan state. Previously it was Thikana of Mertiya Rathores in Marwar State. Sindarli is also known as Sinderli or, in the local language, Hindarli.

Demographics
Sindarli has a population of about 2171 people living in about 424 households. It's a village with 100% Hindu population.

Politics
The people from have a good role in area politics Thakur Sajjan singh sindarli was MLA in 1972 from Sumerpur constituency., Pradhan 2 Times From Desuri Panchyat Samiti and Jila Pramukh from Pali District and Thakur Nathu Singh Mertiya was ex pradhan from Desuri panchayat.
As of 2015 Pinku (Nirmal) Kanwar Mertiya is sarpanch of sindarli and Manohar Singh Mertiya is Upp sarpanch of sindarli gram panchyat.

Famous people
 Sajjan singh sindarli - Sajjan singh ji was the son of Thakur Madho Singh ji. He was twice MLA, once pradhan and ex Jila Pramukh of Pali dist.
Seth Chandulal Ji Rajpurohit - Chandulalji Rajpurohit was Nagar Seth. His father Jayram had a business in South Africa.

References 

Villages in Pali district